Kerry Mackay (born 7 May 1949) is an Australian cricketer. He played eighteen first-class matches for New South Wales between 1970/71 and 1974/75.

See also
 List of New South Wales representative cricketers

References

External links
 

1949 births
Living people
Australian cricketers
New South Wales cricketers
Cricketers from Sydney